Lodgement is a military term meaning an enclave taken by and defended by force.

Lodgement may also refer to:

 Lodgement (finance), a banking or tax term in some countries 
 Lodgement, a type of glacial till